Massat is a commune in the Ariège department in southwestern France.

It is situated on the former Route nationale 618, the "Route of the Pyrenees".

History
The area dates back to paleolithic times, when tribes left some traces in painted caves in the Ker valleys of Massat. The village later became a territory used by the Lords of Lomagne to disperse the population to, overcoming a serious problem of overpopulation. Several charters dating from 1146 specify the reciprocal rights of the inhabitants and the lords. The valley was directed towards an industrial activity lasting almost seven centuries. This included the manufacture of charcoal and cast iron of iron ores in five forging mills operated by Catalan women. From 1820, with the discovery of the means of melting iron with coal, the industrial prosperity of the valley disappeared.

Later in the 19th century, agricultural, primarily pastoral farming became the main source for the Massat economy, particularly the production of butter. With a very strong rural migration, amplified by World War I, the valley depopulated quickly, falling dramatically from 17,000 inhabitants in 1800 to just 1700 in total today, and just 589 in the village.

Population

See also
Communes of the Ariège department
 Col de Port

References

Communes of Ariège (department)
Ariège communes articles needing translation from French Wikipedia